National Federation of Agricultural Workers is the name of:

 National Federation of Agricultural Workers (France)
 National Federation of Agricultural Workers (Italy)